"If She Dies" is the first segment of the fifth episode of the first season (1985–86) from the television series The Twilight Zone. The teleplay, written by David Bennett Carren, was based on a 1982 story originally written by Carren for the Twisted Tales comic book. In the story, a widower's daughter falls into a coma with no prospects of recovery, and he is subsequently haunted by the apparition of an orphan who died before he was born.

Plot
After the recently widowed Paul Marano's only daughter, Cathy, is put into a coma by a car accident, he is guided by the apparition of another girl to buy an old wooden bed from an orphanage sale at a convent next door to the hospital. He places the bed in his daughter's room.

That evening, he finds that the bed is haunted by the girl who asked him to purchase the bed. She asks him to find "Toby" for her. Returning to the convent the next day, he learns that the girl's name was Sarah and she died of tuberculosis many decades earlier while sleeping in the bed. He also learns that Toby was her teddy bear. The sister at the convent who remembers Sarah is reluctant to part with the bear, which was not included in the orphanage sale because it is a memento of Sarah, but Paul convinces her that Sarah is a ghost, and that she may have been left on Earth to accomplish a purpose.

He is given the teddy bear and then takes Cathy home from the hospital and places her in the bed he purchased on behalf of Sarah. Cathy wakes up the next morning and asks for Toby.

External links
 

1985 American television episodes
The Twilight Zone (1985 TV series season 1) episodes
Ghosts in popular culture

fr:Pour qu'elle ne meure pas